Gunnar Stavrum (born 24 October 1961) is a Norwegian newspaper editor and author. Since 2003 he has been chief editor of the online newspaper Nettavisen.

Early years 
Stavrum was born in Kristiansund, and grew up in Bergen and Kristiansand.

Career 
He began his career as a substitute journalist for Fædrelandsvennen in 1982, and for NRK Sørlandet in 1983. He was hired as a journalist for Bergens Tidende in 1985, and became managing editor of Kapital in 1990, and of Dagens Næringsliv in 1993. He worked as a reporter for TV 2 from 1996 to 2000, and from 2000 he was manager of TV 2 Interaktiv AS. Since 2003 he has been chief editor of Nettavisen (named TV 2 Nettavisen until 2008), and executive director of Mediehuset Nettavisen AS from 2008.

As an author he has written biographies about Norwegian billionaires John Fredriksen, Petter Stordalen and Kjell Inge Røkke.

In 2015, he was awarded the "opinion carrier of the year" by the Oslo Editor's Association.

Personal life 
He is married to the secretary general of the Norwegian Press Association, Kjersti Løken Stavrum.

References

1961 births
Living people
People from Kristiansand
Journalists from Bergen
Norwegian biographers
Norwegian male writers
Male biographers
Norwegian newspaper editors
TV 2 (Norway) people